Yorkshire Grey may refer to:
Yorkshire Grey Horse
The Yorkshire Grey, a name of a public house